Christopher Chiyan Tin (born May 21, 1976) is an American composer of art music, often composed for film and video game soundtracks.  His work is primarily orchestral and choral, often with a world music influence.  He won two Grammy Awards for his classical crossover album Calling All Dawns.

Tin is perhaps best known for his choral piece Baba Yetu from the video game Civilization IV, which in 2011 became the first piece of video game music to win a Grammy Award. His Grammy win was considered a significant milestone for the critical acceptance of music from video games as a legitimate art form, and following his win the Recording Academy retitled their visual media categories to become more inclusive of video game soundtracks, before eventually creating a dedicated Grammy award for 'Best Score Soundtrack for Video Games and Other Interactive Media'.

Early life and education

Christopher Tin was raised in Palo Alto, California by immigrant parents from Hong Kong. He worked on his undergraduate education at Stanford University with a brief period as an exchange student at the University of Oxford, double majoring in Music Composition and English Literature, and minoring in Art History.  During this period he supplemented his classical studies by participating in various jazz, musical theatre, and world music student groups.  He graduated in 1998, receiving a BA with Honors and continued to study at Stanford, receiving an MA in Interdisciplinary Studies in Humanities (with an emphasis in film studies) in 1999.

In 1999 he was admitted to the Royal College of Music in London for their MMus in Composition for Screen program, and simultaneously received a Fulbright Scholarship, the first to be awarded for film scoring.  There he studied composition with Joseph Horovitz and orchestration with Julian Anderson, as well as conducting with Neil Thomson.  He graduated with Distinction, also winning the Joseph Horovitz composition prize as the student with the highest overall marks in his course.

Tin is married and has a daughter.

Career

Early career (2000–2005)

While a student at the Royal College of Music, he completed his first commission, the string quartet 'Lacrymosa' for the US Embassy in London.  He also found his first professional employment as a staff arranger for Silva Screen Records; his job was to transcribe orchestral film scores (by John Williams, James Horner, John Barry and others) by ear so that they could be re-recorded by live orchestra for album release.

He moved to Los Angeles in 2000 and continued to arrange scores for Silva Screen Records to pay his way while searching for more permanent employment.  His first internship was with Hans Zimmer.  Subsequently, he found freelance work with composers Joel McNeely, who hired him to make synthesized mockups of his film scores for a series of Disney films; and John Ottman, who gave him some incidental music to write on X2: X-Men United.  He also worked for record producer Michael Brook, who took him to India on tour as a keyboardist.

In 2003 he participated in the Sundance Institute Film Music Lab where he met jazz pianist Billy Childs, who referred him for his first composing job: scoring a documentary for NY Times Television.  This led to a period of modest success writing music for New York-based documentary filmmakers (notably Oscar-nominee Deborah Dickson) and advertising clients (notably Puma).

Baba Yetu (2005)

Tin's biggest break came in 2005, when video game designer Soren Johnson, his former roommate at Stanford, asked him to compose the theme song for Civilization IV. Tin responded with "Baba Yetu", a choral, Swahili version of the Lord's Prayer recorded by his former a cappella group Stanford Talisman.  The song garnered a huge critical response, with over 20 reviewers of the game singling out the theme on IGN, GameSpy, and others.  The first live performance of the song took place on September 21, 2006 at the Hollywood Bowl, as part of a Video Games Live concert, featuring Stanford Talisman and conducted by Jack Wall.

Baba Yetu has achieved enormous popularity outside of the video game industry, and been performed at various venues and events around the world, including Carnegie Hall, Lincoln Center, Kennedy Center, The Dubai Fountain, and the New Year's Concert of the sixty-seventh session of the United Nations General Assembly.  Notable ensembles that have performed the song include the Royal Philharmonic Orchestra, Metropole Orchestra, Welsh National Opera, National Symphony Orchestra, US Navy Band, and various YouTube artists, including Peter Hollens, Alex Boye and the BYU Men's Chorus. It is also a popular competition piece: in 2014 the Welsh choir Côr CF1 won BBC Radio 3's Choir of the Year with their performance, and in 2018 the Angel City Chorale was awarded the Golden Buzzer by Olivia Munn for their rendition on season 13 of America's Got Talent.

It is also one of the most decorated pieces of video game music, holding the distinction of being the first piece of music written for a video game to be both nominated for, and win, a Grammy Award (at the 53rd Annual Grammy Awards in the "Best Instrumental Arrangement Accompanying Vocalist(s)" category).  Additionally it won Tin two awards at the GANG (Game Audio Network Guild) Awards in 2006, as well as two awards in the 10th Annual Independent Music Awards ("Best Song Used in Film/TV/Multimedia" and "Best World Beat Song").  It also entered Tin into the Guinness Book of World Records as the composer of the first video game theme to win a Grammy Award.

Calling All Dawns (2009–2014)
In 2009, Tin released his classical crossover album Calling All Dawns.  The album is a song-cycle in three uninterrupted movements: Day, Night, and Dawn (corresponding to life, death, and rebirth).  The twelve songs are sung in twelve languages, including Swahili, Polish, French, Persian, and Maori. The lyrics are taken from diverse sources, including the Torah, the Bhagavad Gita, Persian and Japanese poetry, and lyrics by contemporary writers. Appropriate vocal traditions are used in the performance of each song, and include African gospel, Beijing opera, medieval chants, and Irish keening.

The album won two Grammys in the 53rd Grammy Awards for Best Classical Crossover Album and Best Instrumental Arrangement Accompanying Vocalist(s) for the song "Baba Yetu", and was nominated for the 'Contemporary Classical Album' category at the 10th Annual Independent Music Awards.  It features performances by the Royal Philharmonic Orchestra (conducted by Lucas Richman), Soweto Gospel Choir, Lia, Aoi Tada, Kaori Omura (大村香織), Jia Ruhan, Dulce Pontes, Anonymous 4, Frederica von Stade, Sussan Deyhim, Stanford Talisman, and On Ensemble.

Despite the fact that Tin had never intended the work to be performed live, many ensembles have performed it.  The first concert was given by Derek Machan and the Waterford Union High School chorus in Waterford, WI.  Subsequently, on April 7, 2013, New York-based concert promoters Distinguished Concerts International New York did the first of multiple large-scale productions at the Avery Fisher Hall at Lincoln Center, conducted by Jonathan Griffith and featuring original album artists Anonymous 4, Ron Ragin, Shayok Misha Chowdhury and Roopa Mahadevan.  On July 19, 2016 the Royal Philharmonic Orchestra performed excerpts with the combined Angel City Chorale, Prima Vocal Ensemble and Lucis choirs at Cadogan Hall in London.  And on July 5, 2017 at the 70th Anniversary of the Llangollen International Musical Eisteddfod, Tin himself conducted the entire work with the Welsh National Opera Orchestra and a group of international soloists, including Elin Manahan Thomas, Nathalie Pires, Joel Virgel, and Nominjin, and a mass choir made up of singers from Wales, South Africa, Taiwan, and the United States.  The concert was filmed and subsequently broadcast on Welsh television station S4C.

The Drop That Contained the Sea (2014–2016)
Tin's second album, titled The Drop That Contained the Sea, premiered live at Carnegie Hall on April 13, 2014. It was performed by a combined chorus of multiple singing groups from around the United States, Canada, and England, as part of an all-Tin concert produced by Distinguished Concerts International New York. It consists of ten songs, each sung in a different language, beginning with Proto-Indo-European and including Bulgarian, Turkish, Mongolian, Xhosa, Ancient Greek and Sanskrit. The song cycle follows the water cycle much like Calling All Dawns followed the day and night cycle.

The album was recorded at Abbey Road Studios with Tin conducting the Royal Philharmonic Orchestra, and features guest performances by the Soweto Gospel Choir, Le Mystère des Voix Bulgares, Kardeş Türküler, Dulce Pontes, Nominjin, Roopa Mahadevan, Anonymous 4, the Angel City Chorale, and Norwegian chamber choir Schola Cantorum.  Upon release, it achieved #1 status on the Billboard Classical Charts.

Tin centered his first tour around the work, conducting it in three cities in the UK.  The European premiere was given on July 16, 2016 at the Barbican in York, with the Mowbray Orchestra and combined Angel City Chorale and Prima Vocal Ensemble choirs, followed by concerts at the Harrogate Music Festival, and in London with the Royal Philharmonic Orchestra.

Sogno di Volare (2016)
Tin returned to the Civilization franchise to compose the main theme for Civilization VI, a choral anthem called "Sogno di Volare" (The Dream of Flight) that used a modernized version of Leonardo da Vinci's writings on flight as its lyrics.  Tin explained in a statement that he hoped the piece would capture the "essence of exploration; both the physical exploration of seeking new lands, but also the mental exploration of expanding the frontiers of science and philosophy."  The piece was given its world premiere in concert on July 19, 2016 at London's Cadogan Hall, conducted by the composer himself, and performed by the Royal Philharmonic Orchestra, Angel City Chorale, Lucis and Prima Vocal Ensemble combined choirs.

To Shiver the Sky (2020)
Tin released his third album, To Shiver the Sky, in August 2020 on the Decca Gold label. Like his previous albums, the eleven tracks have lyrics in multiple languages based on existing texts, with a theme of the history of aviation, expanding from "Sogno di Volare". It was funded through Kickstarter in 2018, becoming the highest funded classical music project on Kickstarter.

The album, like the previous one, was recorded at Abbey Road Studios with Tin conducting the Royal Philharmonic Orchestra, and features guest performances by Danielle de Niese, Pene Pati, ModernMedieval Voices, Anna Lapwood, the Pembroke College Girls' Choir, the Royal Opera Chorus, and The Assembly.

After being postponed due to the Covid-19 pandemic, To Shiver the Sky was premiered live on May 15, 2022 at The Anthem in Washington D.C. The premiere featured the United States Air Force Band, Choral Arts Society of Washington, and ModernMedieval.

The Lost Birds (2022) 
Tin’s fourth album, titled The Lost Birds, was released on September 30, 2022 on the Decca Classics label, debuting at No. 2 on the Billboard Classical Charts.  It was nominated for a Grammy award in the 'Best Classical Compendium' category, with winners to be announced in February 2023. The album features popular British ensemble VOCES8 and Tin’s longtime collaborators the Royal Philharmonic Orchestra. It consists of twelve movements, ten of which use texts by poets Emily Dickinson, Sara Teasdale, Edna St. Vincent Millay, and Cristina Rossetti, along with two purely instrumental tracks. Unlike Tin’s previous works, all movements of the piece are sung in English. The album is a musical memorial to bird species driven to extinction by humankind and a celebration of their beauty, while also presenting a warning about humanity's own tenuous existence on the planet. The album was funded once again via Kickstarter, and Tin broke his own record for highest funded classical music project on the platform.

The Lost Birds was recorded in two parts; the vocal elements of the album were recorded at the VOCES8 Centre, conducted by Barnaby Smith, while the instrumental elements were recorded at Abbey Road Studios, conducted by Tin. This allowed better balance between the choir and the orchestra. 

The Lost Birds was premiered virtually by VOCES8 as part of their 'LIVE from London' series on October 15, 2022. The performance featured The VOCES8 Foundation Choir and Orchestra, with Barnaby Smith conducting. The work’s live premiere is scheduled for February 25, 2023 at Stanford University. This will also be the first performance using the reduced, chamber orchestration of the work.

Collaborative projects
In 2009, Tin and multi-instrumentalist and producer Shoji Kameda formed a Los Angeles-based production duo, Stereo Alchemy. Their debut album God of Love, was released on Valentine's Day, February 14, 2012.  It featured a variety of Renaissance and Romantic era poems (from Thomas Carew, Christina Rossetti, John Donne and others) reinvented as lyrics for trip hop and synth pop songs.

In 2015 Tin composed the orchestral arrangements for trance artist BT's remix album Electronic Opus.

In 2017 Tin announced an EDM-meets-orchestra collaboration with Australian DJ TyDi called Collide.  Their first single "Closing In", featuring vocals by Dia Frampton, was released October 6, 2017.

Tin collaborated with Lang Lang on the 2016 release of a piano and orchestra suite of music from Crouching Tiger, Hidden Dragon. Additionally, Tin has collaborated with Danny Elfman and Alan Menken.

Tin has received commissions by Stratus Chamber Orchestra, Bangor Symphony Orchestra, Orchestra at St. Matthew's and ISCMS Festival. He also co-created the startup sound for the original Microsoft Surface computing platform.

Tin arranged a number of jazz tunes for 2018 film 'Crazy Rich Asians', one being based on the Chinese melody, When Will You Return?. This arrangement was chosen by director Jon M. Chu and Warner Brothers to open the film.

Tin's other film credits include writing additional music for Sausage Party (2016), Suddenly Seventeen (2016), Tess (2016), Dante's Inferno (2010), Deadspace: Aftermath (2011), Hoodwinked Too! Hood Vs. Evil (2011) and X2: X-Men United (2003).

Television appearances
Tin was a judge on the 2017 season of the Welsh TV show Cor Cymru, a singing competition for amateur choirs airing on S4C.

Other positions 
Tin is Honorary Artistic Director of the United Nations Chamber Music Society, Honorary President of the International Choral Festival Wales, and is a patron of El Sistema France. He is also an honorary board member of the Chinese American Museum DC.

Awards

GRAMMY Awards

Video game industry awards

Songwriting awards

Concert works
Tin's concert works are predominantly choral and orchestral, and often feature languages rarely used in the realm of classical music:

Song cycles
 (2009) Calling All Dawns
 (2014) The Drop That Contained the Sea
 (21/8/2020, World premiere) To Shiver the Sky
 (2022) The Lost Birds

Choral works with orchestra
 (2005) Baba Yetu
 (2009) Kia Hora Te Marino
 (2009) Mado Kara Mieru
 (2013) Temen Oblak
 (2013) Iza Ngomso
 (2016) Sogno di Volare
 (2017) Silver Wing
 (2017) Adain Can

Vocal solo with orchestra
 (2013) Passou o Verao

Orchestra with soloist(s)
 (2014) Shinobu vs. Ghost Warrior

Chamber
 (1999) Lacrymosa (string quartet)

Piano solo
 (2009) Nocturne No. 2

Games 

 (2012) Karateka
 (2016) Offworld Trading Company
 (2016) Civilization VI
 (2018) Rise of Kingdoms
 (2019) Splitgate
 (2021) Old World (video game)

References

External links
 
 Stereo Alchemy official site
 
 

21st-century classical composers
Alumni of the Royal College of Music
Alumni of the University of Oxford
American film score composers
American television composers
Jingle composers
American male film score composers
People from Redwood City, California
American classical musicians of Chinese descent
Living people
Stanford University alumni
Video game composers
1976 births
Grammy Award winners
21st-century American composers
Palo Alto High School alumni
21st-century American male musicians
Fulbright alumni